The BRP Quezon (PS-70) was one of two Rizal class ships in service with the Philippine Navy. She was formerly a USN Auk class minesweeper produced during World War II, and was later on classified as a patrol corvette protecting the vast waters of the Philippines.

Along with other ex-World War II veteran ships of the Philippine Navy, she was considered one of the oldest active fighting ships in the world, up until its decommissioning on 1 March 2021 after serving a total of 77 years, of which 53 years were with the Philippine Navy.

History
 was originally laid down for the Royal Navy under the lend-lease program as HMS Exploit (BAM-24). However the United States Navy decided to keep the ship and renamed her Vigilance (AM-324) on 23 January 1943.

Commissioned in the US Navy in 1944, her first duties included screening of transport convoys between Pearl Harbor and the Marshall Islands and local escort duties between Guam, Peleliu, and Ulithiat. She also did minesweeping duties and anti-submarine patrols near Okinawa, was able to assist in anti-aircraft duties with other vessels, and assisting in firefighting and treatment of wounded from USS Whitehurst (DE-634) and USS England (DE-635). She was able to shoot a number of attacking Japanese aircraft during this period. She continued on minesweeping and patrol duties in Leyte, Philippine Islands, and in the Japanese home islands before and after Japan surrendered. With her service during World War II, she was awarded with three battle stars.

She was then transferred to the Philippines on 19 August 1967 and was commissioned to the Philippine Navy as the RPS (now BRP) Quezon (PS-70), and together with her sister ship, was one of the Navy's main warships during the 1960s up to the present.

She was stricken from the navy in late 1994, but was overhauled at the Cavite Naval Dockyard and returned to service in 1995. Some of her weapons were also removed, mainly its anti-submarine equipment due to lack of spare parts. This includes the five Mk6 depth charge projectors and two depth charge racks. This move totally removed her anti-submarine warfare capabilities, which were outdated. Quezon completed a rehabilitation overhaul in April 1996 by Hatch & Kirk, wherein she was fitted with a remanufactured EMD 645C diesel engines, rehabilitation works, and equipping the ship with state-of-the-art safety equipment on deck and engine room with all digital control panels. Recent upgrades includes a satellite radio dish for communications.

Present Status
Her last classification was Patrol Corvette. She was assigned to the Patrol Force of the Philippine Navy, which was later renamed as the Offshore Combat Force.

The ship retired on 1 March 2021 together with 3 other ageing navy ships.

Notable Deployments and Operations

Exercises

On 10 April 2007, Quezon, together with BRP Artemio Ricarte and BRP Bienvenido Salting, took part in a 10-day naval exercises with the Malaysian Navy dubbed "MALPHI LAUT 2007". Malaysian vessels that took part include KD Kedah, KD Laksamana Tan Pusmah, and KD Yu.

On 19–23 July 2011, BRP Quezon together with BRP Bacolod City (LC-550) was part of Amphibious Exercise PAGSISIKAP 2011 held in Manila Bay.

Deployments

BRP Quezon represented the Philippines in the Indonesian Fleet Review and Sail Bunaken 2009 festival, an international sea event held in Manado, North Sulawesi, Indonesia.

BRP Quezon together with BRP Dagupan City (LC-551) were sent to Singapore and Malaysia from November to December 2009 for an overseas training cruise for students from the Naval Education and Training Command and the Fleet Training Center, and as part of the Philippine contingent at Langkawi International Maritime and Aerospace Exhibit (LIMA) in Malaysia.

Gallery

See also
 Philippine Navy
 Auk class minesweeper
 List of decommissioned ships of the Philippine Navy

References

External links
 Philippine Navy Official website
 Philippine Fleet Official Website
 Philippine Defense Forum
 Hazegray World Navies Today: Philippines
 Naming and Code Designation of PN Ships
 USS England DE-635 Official Website
 World Warships: Philippines
 Opus224's Unofficial Philippine Defense Page

Rizal-class corvettes
Ships built in Seattle
1943 ships
Corvettes of the Philippines